Bollé may refer to:
 
 Bollé, Burkina Faso, a village in Burkina Faso
 Bollé Brands, a safety eyewear/sunglasses manufacturer 
 Hermann Bollé (1845–1926), Austrian architect
 Jacques Bolle (born 1959), French Grand Prix motorcycle road racer
 Mount Bolle, Antarctica

See also
 Bollée (disambiguation)
 Bolle (disambiguation)